William King (1663–1712) was an English poet.

Life
Born in London, England, the son of Ezekiel King, he was related to the family of Edward Hyde, 1st Earl of Clarendon.  From Westminster School, where he was a scholar under Richard Busby, at the age of 18, he was elected to Christ Church, Oxford in 1681. There he is said to have dedicated himself completely to his studies. Reportedly after eight years he had read over 22,000 books and manuscripts, a figure reduced to about 7,000 in seven years by Thomas Young.

In 1688 he graduated M.A. Taking up the civil law, became Doctor in 1692, and was admitted as an advocate at Doctors' Commons. In 1702, having moved to Ireland, he was made Judge of the Admiralty, Commissioner of the Prizes, Keeper of the Records in Birmingham's Tower, and Vicar-General to Narcissus Marsh, the primate. King found a friend in Anthony Upton, one of the High Court judges, who had a house called Mountown, near Dublin, where King frequently stayed. Both men were severely criticised by their political opponents for neglecting their official duties: it was said that they had no ambition but to live out their days in rural retirement.

In 1708, when Lord Wharton was sent to govern Ireland, King returned to London.

In 1710 he became a supporter of the High Church party, on the side of Henry Sacheverell; and was supposed to have had some part in setting up The Examiner.  He was suspicious of the operations of Whiggism; and he criticised White Kennet's adulatory sermon at the funeral of the Duke of Devonshire.

In the autumn of 1712, King's health declined and he died on Christmas Day.

Works
In 1688, King published Reflections upon Mons Varillas's History of Heresy, written with Edward Hannes, a confutation of Antoine Varillas's account of John Wycliffe. He had already made some translations from the French language, and written some humorous and satirical pieces and in 1694, Molesworth published his Account of Denmark, in which he treated the Danes and their monarch with great contempt. This book offended Prince George of Denmark, the consort of Queen Anne; and the Danish Minister protested.

In 1699, he published A Journey to London, after the method of Dr Martin Lister, who had published A Journey to Paris.  And in 1700 he satirised the Royal Society — or at least, Sir Hans Sloane, their president — in two dialogues, entitled The Transactioner. At Mountown, home of his friend Mr Justice Upton, he wrote the poem Mully of Mountown.

Back in London, King published some essays, called Useful Transactions, including Voyage to the Island of Cajamai.  He then wrote the Art of Love, a poem; and in 1709 imitated Horace in an Art of Cookery, which he published with some letters to Lister. The History of the  Gods, a book composed for schools, was written in 1711. The same year he published Rufinus, a historical essay; and a political poem on Duke of Marlborough and his adherents.

References
Johnson, Samuel.  "William King."  In Lives of the English Poets.
Andrew Robinson, "The Last Man Who Knew Everything" (London: Plume, 2007), p. 25.

Notes

Attribution

External links

1663 births
1712 deaths
17th-century English poets
17th-century English male writers
18th-century English poets
People educated at Westminster School, London
Members of Doctors' Commons
18th-century English male writers